Jameel Jaffer is a human rights and civil liberties attorney and the inaugural director of the Knight First Amendment Institute at Columbia University, which was created to defend the freedoms of speech and the press in the digital age. The Institute engages in "strategic litigation, research, and public education." Among the Knight Institute's first lawsuits was a successful constitutional challenge to President Trump's practice of blocking critics from his Twitter account. 

Jaffer was previously a Deputy Legal Director at the American Civil Liberties Union. In that role, he was particularly notable for the role he played in litigating Freedom of Information Act requests that led to the release of documents concerning the torture of prisoners held at the Guantanamo Bay detention camp and in CIA black sites. Among the documents released were interrogation directives signed by Secretary of Defense Donald Rumsfeld; emails written by FBI agents who witnessed the torture of prisoners; autopsy reports relating to prisoners who were killed in U.S. custody; and legal memos in which the Office of Legal Counsel stated that so-called "enhanced interrogation techniques" involving mental and physical torment and coercion that were widely regarded as torture might be legally permissible under an expansive interpretation of presidential authority. The New York Times billed the lawsuit "one of the most successful in the history of public disclosure."

Personal life and Education
Jaffer's family originates from Tanzania; his father's side is from Zanzibar while his mother's side is from Dar es Salaam. His family follow the Isma'ilism sect of Islam, although Jaffer does not describe himself as religious.

Jaffer grew up in Canada and is a graduate of Upper Canada College, a private school in Toronto. Jaffer received his bachelor's degree from Williams College in 1994, his master's degree from the University of Cambridge in 1996, and his Juris Doctor degree from Harvard Law School in 1999, where he was an editor of the Harvard Law Review. After graduating from Harvard, Jaffer served as a law clerk to the Rt. Hon. Beverley McLachlin, the then-Chief Justice of Canada.

Legal career
Jaffer is the founding director of the Knight First Amendment Institute at Columbia University. He was on the staff of the American Civil Liberties Union (ACLU) from June 2002 until August 2016.

In 2004, Jaffer litigated a successful constitutional challenge to the USA Patriot Act, obtaining a federal court ruling that invalidated the "national security letter" provision. After Congress amended the law, the federal district court invalidated the provision again in 2007.

In 2006, Jaffer filed a case challenging the Bush administration's refusal to issue a visa to Tariq Ramadan, a well-known Islamic thinker. The case was brought on behalf of the American Association of Religion, the American Association of University Professors, and PEN American Center. A federal appeals court sided with Jaffer and his clients in 2009, finding that the exclusion of Professor Ramadan was unconstitutional. After that ruling, the Obama administration reversed the exclusion of Dr. Ramadan and issued him a visa.

In 2012 and 2013, Jaffer argued two successful appeals, one before the U.S. Court of Appeals for the D.C. Circuit and another before the U.S. Court of Appeals for the Second Circuit, relating to the Obama administration's refusal to release Justice Department memos concerning the "targeted killing" program.

In 2012, Jaffer argued Clapper v. Amnesty International USA before the U.S. Supreme Court. The case involved a constitutional challenge to a federal statute that gave the National Security Agency broad power to monitor international communications. The Supreme Court ruled against the plaintiffs 5-4, holding that they lacked "standing" to bring their suit.

Along with Jimmy Wales and Lila Tretikov of the Wikimedia Foundation, Jaffer filed a lawsuit in March 2015 against the National Security Agency (NSA) challenging the agency's surveillance activities "through which the U.S. government intercepts, copies, and searches almost all international and many domestic text-based communications" on the Wikimedia platform.

Between 2010 and 2016, Jaffer co-led the litigation that resulted in the disclosure of the Obama administration's "drone memos." Jaffer's book about the U.S. drone campaign, The Drone Memos: Targeted Killing, Secrecy, and the Law, was published by The New Press in November 2016. Edward Snowden called the book "a much-needed corrective to the linguistic manipulation and official obfuscation that have made [the targeted-killing] policies possible."

Until August 2016, Jaffer was deputy legal director of the ACLU, and director of the ACLU's Center for Democracy, which housed the ACLU's work relating to free speech, privacy, technology, national security, and international human rights. He litigated many leading cases relating to national security and human rights, including cases concerning surveillance, torture, rendition, and "targeted killing."

Jaffer is an Executive Editor of Just Security, a national security blog.

Community Events
Jaffer was invited to celebrate Ramadan at the White House in 2009.

References

External links

1971 births
Living people
Canadian lawyers
Harvard Law School alumni
American civil rights lawyers
American human rights activists
Upper Canada College alumni
Williams College alumni
Canadian expatriates in the United States
Canadian people of Tanzanian descent
Canadian Ismailis
Columbia University faculty
Canadian people of Indian descent
Canadian people of Gujarati descent
Khoja Ismailism